Blue Holes National Park is a national park in Andros, the Bahamas.

Flora and fauna
The park's blue holes contain various unique cavefish and invertebrates. The park also contains thousands of acres of pine forest, which provide habitat for birds such as the Bahama oriole, great lizard cuckoo, western spindalis, red-legged thrush, black-faced grassquit and Cuban emerald.

References

Further reading

National parks of the Bahamas
Andros, Bahamas